Dio is a cover album by Jørn Lande's solo project Jorn, released in July 2010. The album was recorded as a tribute to the singer Ronnie James Dio and consists of covers of songs from Dio, Black Sabbath and Rainbow, with one original composition written for Ronnie James Dio. Lande describes the album as a "fine collection of songs that present the music of The Man and The Artist, with a unique twist" and a "sincere and heartfelt “thank you” to a great and influential Artist" who "has affected my life and career in such a way that without his presence, I would not have become the artist I am today". A music video for the song "Song for Ronnie James" was released on YouTube. The announcement of the album did not pass off without critique however, as Lande was accused of exploiting the death of Dio. Frontiers Records President released a statement in which he denies those accusations and explains that the album had been in the works since spring of 2009, before Dio's death in May 2010. In South America the album is called Song For Ronnie James.

Track listing

Personnel
Jørn Lande - lead vocals
Tor Erik Myhre - guitars
Igor Gianola - guitars
Tore Moren - guitars
Nic Angileri - bass
Willy Bendiksen - drums, percussion
Tommy Hansen - keyboards

Charts

Release history

References 

Ronnie James Dio tribute albums
2010 albums
Jørn Lande albums
Frontiers Records albums